"Generation Lost" is a song by American hip hop recording artist B.o.B, taken from his fourth mixtape, Who the F%*k is B.o.B? (2008). The song, produced by B.o.B himself, was also included on B.o.B's then-Grand Hustle label-mate Killer Mike's compilation album, Underground Atlanta (2009). In November 2014, B.o.B released a politically-charged mixtape, titled New Black. The mixtape, which is a cohesive concept album, includes "Generation Lost", as the third track.

Background
In an interview with Complex Magazine, B.o.B acknowledged the irony that he was becoming famous, for doing anti-mainstream music and called it a "blend of both worlds". When asked about the song, B.o.B said: "I wasn't like, 'I need to make this song for radio.' In my world, I'm cool because I know there are fans of music who don't listen to the radio."

Reception
Complex Magazine listed "Generation Lost" as one of the "Key B.o.B Songs You Should Know." About.com included the song at #32 on its subjective ranking "Top 100 Rap Songs of 2008."

References

2008 songs
B.o.B songs
Songs written by B.o.B
Song recordings produced by B.o.B
Songs about the media
Protest songs
Songs against racism and xenophobia
Songs about radio